Dragon and Liberator is the final book of Timothy Zahn's Dragonback series. It is divided into two sub-plots: one depicting Jack (a former burglar, 14 years old) and sidekick Draycos (a dragon-like entity periodically assuming two-dimensional form upon Jack's skin) opposing the criminal alliance intent on rendering Draycos's species extinct, and the other depicting Alison (an industrial spy of Jack's age) and her partner Taneem (a female of Draycos's species) in captivity. Both sub-plots occur largely on faster-than-light spaceships en route to an unidentified destination.

Publication history
The novel was first published in 2008 by Tom Doherty and Associates, New York.

Plot
Attempting to learn the location in space at which their enemies plan to destroy Draycos's compatriots and their humanoid symbionts, the Shontine people, Alison and Taneem are attacked and conceal themselves in the safe containing the location's record. Jack, trying to rescue them, is imprisoned for vehicle theft. He is rescued by the soldier Harper (sometime bodyguard to industrialist Cornelius Braxton, apparent in the first book of the series). In the safe, Alison speculates that Taneem and Draycos's ancestors were genetically engineered on Earth, by ancient astronauts or a lost civilization, to accompany humans; this becomes important later in the book. Having escaped the safe aboard an interstellar spacecraft, Alison and Taneem spy on their enemies and attempt minor sabotage of relations among the same. On the (fictional) planet Bentren, Jack and Draycos capture a spacecraft purchased by their enemies and therein infiltrate the hostile fleet, to sabotage the mission itself––chiefly by destroying the enemy's supreme weapon, located aboard the principal spacecraft. The weapon, called simply the Death, is described as a 'vibration of space' capable of penetrating all physical barriers and of instantaneously annulling its target's entire metabolism. Meanwhile, Harper, having ingratiated himself with the enemies' commanders, assists Taneem in espionage on them. Jack and Draycos, in turn, are assisted by Jonathan Langston, another soldier introduced in the previous book, Dragon and Judge. To delay and distract the enemy, Alison sabotages one of their spacecraft and presents herself to their leaders Col. Frost and Arthur Neverlin as the daughter of General Aram Davi, founder of the mercenary organization to which Frost belongs, while Harper shelters Taneem. When the mercenaries begin their attack on Draycos's people, Harper carries out a kamikaze strike in hope of exposing the Death to its intended victims; although this fails, Jack and Draycos re-create his attempt. Having unexpectedly survived, as the symbiosis of human and K'da (the name given, throughout the series, to Draycos's species) renders both immune to the Death, they transmit warnings to the friendly fleets including both the Shontine/K'da and Cornelius Braxton's own army (invited by Harper), which overcome Frost and Neverlin's forces. Alison is thereafter identified as Braxton's granddaughter, and Jack appointed Braxton's liaison to the K'da and Shontine.

2008 American novels
2008 science fiction novels
American science fiction novels
Novels by Timothy Zahn